Division 2 is the fourth level in the league system of Swedish football and comprises 84 Swedish football teams. Division 2 had status as the official second level from 1928 to 1986 but was replaced by Division 1 in 1987. It then had status as the official third level until 2005 but was replaced once again by the recreated Division 1 in 2006.

Overview
In the Division, there are 84 clubs which are divided in six groups of 14 teams each representing a geographical area. During the course of a season (starting in April and ending in October) each club plays the others twice, once at their home stadium and once at that of their opponents, for a total of 26 games. At the end of each season the two lowest placed teams of each group are relegated to Division 3 and the twelve winning teams from the twelve Division 3 leagues are promoted in their place while the third lowest placed teams in the Division 2 leagues plays promotion/relegation play-offs against the twelve second placed teams in Division 3. The top team in each Division 2 group is promoted to Division 1 and the three lowest placed teams from each Division 1 league are relegated in their place.

Administration
The Swedish Football Association ( SvFF) is responsible for the administration of Division 2.

Historical context
Division 2 is the fourth-highest division in Swedish Football.  It currently comprises six regional leagues which may show some small changes to their titles year on year reflecting the changing geographical distribution of clubs.  The six sections for the 2014 season cover Norrland, Norra Svealand, Södra Svealand, Norra Götaland, Västra Götaland and Östra Götaland.

The name of Division 2 has been around since 1924/25 season when there were 5 sections titled Uppsvenskan, Mellansvenskan, Östsvenskan, Västsvenskan and Sydsvenskan which were run on an unofficial basis. Division 2 became official in 1928/29 as the second tier of Swedish football with 2 sections being created - Norra and Södra - with a total of 20 teams.

In 1932/33 Division 2 was expanded into 4 sections covering Norra, Östra, Västra and Södra.  This format continued until the end of the 1946/47 season. For the 1947/48 season a 2 section structure was restored comprising the Nordöstra and Sydvästra sections. In 1953/54 a section representing the northern clubs in Sweden was introduced for the first time known as Norrland. The other two sections were titled Svealand and Götaland. In 1955/56 it was decided that Götaland should have 2 sections. This provided Division 2 with 4 sections covering Norrland, Svealand, Östra Götaland and Västra Götaland.

In 1972 the structure reverted to 3 sections titled Norra, Mellersta and Södra.  This was short-lived and in 1974 two sections covering Norra and Södra were consolidated. This system continued until the end of the 1986 season when the competition became Division 1.

From 1987 onwards Division 2 became the third highest league in Swedish football and this continued until 2005. The new division initially had 4 sections titled Norra, Mellersta, Östra and Västra. In 1993 it was divided into 6 sections titled Norrland, Östra Svealand, Västra Svealand, Östra Götaland, Västra Götaland and Södra Götaland.

In 2006 Division 2 became Sweden's fourth highest division with the introduction of Division 1 below the Superettan.

Current clubs
2022 season.

Division 2 Norrland
Bergnäsets AIK
Bodens BK
Friska Viljor FC 
Gottne IF
IFK Luleå
IFK Östersund
Kiruna FF
Sandviks IK
Skellefteå FF
Storfors AIK
Stöde IF
Umeå FC Akademi
Ytterhogdals IK
Älgarna-Härnösands IF

Division 2 Norra Svealand
FC Gute
FC Järfälla
Forsbacka IK
Hudiksvalls FF
IFK Stocksund
IFK Uppsala
IFK Österåker
Korsnäs IF FK
Kungsängens IF
Kvarnsvedens IK
Rågsveds IF
Sandvikens AIK
Skiljebo SK

On 12 April 2022 Akropolis IF was excluded from participating in the league following a walkover against Hudiksvalls FF on 9 April.

Division 2 Södra Svealand
Arameisk-Syrianska IF
Assyriska FF
Enskede IK
Huddinge IF
IFK Eskilstuna
IFK Lidingö FK
IK Sleipner
Karlbergs BK
Nyköpings BIS
Smedby AIS
Syrianska FC
Trosa-Vagnhärad SK
United Nordic IK
Värmbols FC

Division 2 Norra Götaland
Ahlafors IF
Angered BK
Grebbestads IF
Herrestads AIF
IFK Kumla
IK Gauthiod
Karlslunds IF
Lidköpings FK
Mjölby AI FF
Nordvärmlands FF
Säffle SK
Stenungsunds IF
Vänersborgs FK
Yxhults IK

Division 2 Västra Götaland
Assyriska BK
BK Astrio
Eskilsminne IF
Hittarps IK
Höganäs BK
Husqvarna FF
Landvetter IS
Onsala BK
Sävedalens IF
Torslanda IK
Tölö IF
Ullareds IK
Varbergs GIF
Västra Frölunda IF

Division 2 Södra Götaland
Ariana FC
Asarums IF
Eslövs BK
FBK Balkan
FC Rosengård 1917
FK Karlskrona
Hässleholms IF
Högsby IK
IFK Berga
IFK Hässleholm
Kristianstad FC
Nosaby IF
Räppe GOIF
Österlen FF

Seasons – league tables

Player of the year awards

Ever since 2003 the online bookmaker Unibet have given out awards at the end of the season to the best players in Division 2. The recipients are decided by a jury of sportsjournalists, coaches and football experts.

2003

2004

2005

2006

2007

2008

2009

2010

2011

2012

2013

2014

References 

 
Sports leagues established in 1924
1924 establishments in Sweden
Swe
Professional sports leagues in Sweden